Raja Michael Flores, M.D., is an American thoracic surgeon and former candidate for mayor of New York City, currently Chief of the Division of Thoracic Surgery at Mount Sinai Hospital and Ames Professor of Cardiothoracic Surgery at the Icahn School of Medicine at Mount Sinai, both in New York City. On March 20, 2021, Dr. Flores announced his campaign for mayor of NYC.

Biography

Flores received a B.A. in biochemistry from New York University in 1988 and his M.D. from Albert Einstein College of Medicine in 1992. His internship (1992–1993) and residency (1993–1997) at Columbia-Presbyterian Medical Center were followed by a Thoracic Oncology Clinical Research Fellowship (1997–1998) in Intraoperative Chemotherapy, Mesothelioma and Lung Cancer at Brigham and Women's Hospital/Dana–Farber Cancer Institute, and a Cardiothoracic Surgery Residency (1998-2000) at Harvard Medical School, both in Boston, Massachusetts.

Flores is currently an editorial board member for the World Journal of Gastrointestinal Surgery, the World Journal of Gastrointestinal Edoscopy and the World Journal of Respirology. He is a reviewer for 13 other journals including Head & Neck, the Journal of Thoracic and Cardiovascular Surgery, the Journal of Thoracic Oncology and the Journal of Clinical Oncology. Memberships include the American College of Chest Physicians, the American College of Surgeons Oncology Group and the American Society of Clinical Oncology.

Research
Flores' research has significantly impacted the surgical management of pleural mesothelioma by demonstrating that partial pleural membrane removal is as effective a treatment as lung removal. He was instrumental in creating VATS lobectomy as the standard in the surgical treatment of lung cancer and is considered a pioneer in the use of intraoperative chemotherapy for mesothelioma.

Flores is the author of more than 60 book chapters, reviews, monographs and abstracts and more than 150 publications. He serves as a reviewer for 13 journals and has been an editorial board member on four journals. He is the principal investigator on five clinical trials and has been ranked in the top 1% in his field by U.S. News & World Report.

Flores’ areas of interest include lung cancer screening, thoracoscopy, VATS lobectomy, extrapleural pneumonectomy for mesothelioma, asbestos, tracheal stenosis, carinal surgery and esophageal cancer surgery. He is the principal investigator for a clinical trial of neoadjuvant gemcitabine and cisplatin followed by extrapleural pneumonectomy and high-dose radiation.

Other research includes:

Publications
Partial list:

References

Albert Einstein College of Medicine alumni
Living people
Icahn School of Medicine at Mount Sinai faculty
New York University Grossman School of Medicine alumni
American thoracic surgeons
Candidates in the 2021 United States elections
Year of birth missing (living people)